The 2018–19 ASUN Conference men's basketball season began with practices in October 2018, followed by the start of the 2018–19 NCAA Division I men's basketball season in November. Conference play began in January 2019 and concluded in March 2019. It was the 41st season of ASUN Conference basketball.

Lipscomb and Liberty tied for the regular season championship and were named co-champions. The ASUN tournament was held March 4–10 at campus sites as top seeds hosted each round.

Preseason 
On October 17, 2018, the conference announced its preseason honors and polls.

Preseason men's basketball coaches poll
(First place votes in parenthesis)
 Lipscomb (7) 79
 FGCU (1) 66
 Liberty 63
 North Florida (1) 61
 Jacksonville 40
 NJIT 38
 Kennesaw State 26
 Stetson 20
 North Alabama 12

Preseason men's basketball media poll
(First place votes in parenthesis)
 Lipscomb (44) 438
 FGCU (2) 374
 Liberty 338
 North Florida (2) 304
 Jacksonville (2) 254
 NJIT 203
 Kennesaw State 147
 Stetson 121
 North Alabama 71

Honors
Preseason Player of the Year: Garrison Mathews, Lipscomb
Preseason Defensive Player of the Year: Noah Horchler, North Florida
Fan-Voted Preseason Player of the Year: Kendall Stafford, North Alabama (640 votes)
Fan-Voted Preseason Defensive Player of the Year: Reilly Walsh, NJIT (93 votes)

Conference matrix

All-Atlantic Sun awards

Atlantic Sun men's basketball weekly awards

Postseason

References